This is a list of seasons completed by the Texas A&M Aggies men's basketball team since its conception in 1912. The list documents season-by-season records, conference standings, NCAA appearances, and championships won.

Texas A&M belonged to the Southwest Conference from 1915–1995 before joining the Big 12 Conference in 1996. Texas A&M has competed in the Southeastern Conference since July 1, 2012. The team has 12 regular-season conference championships, 2 conference tournament championships, and 10 NCAA tournament appearances. They have no NCAA championships.

Season-by-season results

      National champion  
      Postseason invitational champion  

      Conference regular season champion   
      Conference regular season and conference tournament champion

      Division regular season champion
      Division regular season and conference tournament champion

      Conference tournament champion

Notes

  Metcalf coached the first 19 games, going 9–10 and 2–3 in conference. Thornton finished the season, going 5–7 and 5–6 in conference.

References

Texas AandM Aggies
Texas A&M Aggies basketball